Annie Wu Suk-ching, SBS, JP (born 13 September 1948) is a Hong Kong businesswoman of Taishan, Guangdong origin. She is the eldest daughter of Dr James Tak Wu, founder of Maxim's Catering, and is a member of the Standing Committee of the Chinese People's Political Consultative Conference.

Early life and career
Wu was born and grew up in Hong Kong, and studied at Sacred Heart Canossian College and then (1968-70) at Armstrong College in Berkeley in the United States.

Wu is honorary president of Beijing Air Catering Ltd, the first sino-foreign joint-venture company to be set up in the People's Republic of China. She is the managing director of private firm Hong Kong Beijing Air Catering Ltd.

Opposition to 2019–20 Hong Kong protests
In September 2019, Wu attracted attention when she criticised the Hong Kong anti-extradition bill protest.  She drew praise from Chinese newspaper People’s Daily shortly after competitor (in mooncake sales) Garic Kwok had been praised in Hong Kong but criticised by many in Hong Kong for supporting the protests, harming sales there of his family's Taipan Bread & Cakes brand. Later the same month, as supervisory consultant of the Hong Kong Federation of Women, Wu took her views to the United Nations Human Rights Council, igniting protests and vandalization directed at her father's Maxim's restaurant chain.

Wu also put pressure on the Chinese Foundation Secondary School, which she founded in 2000, to punish staff and students who supported the protests.

Affiliations
As a member of the CPPCC, Wu is one of the 1200 people whose votes determine the Chief Executive of Hong Kong.

Wu received the HKSAR's Silver Bauhinia Star in 1999. She was made an Honorary Doctor of Humane Letters Degree by Carleton College in Northfield, Minnesota in 2009.

She is the Honorary Consul of the United Republic of Tanzania in Hong Kong and Macau.  She is also the Chairperson of AMTD Group's Global Advisory Committee.

Wu helped establish the Hong Kong Federation of Women, an organisation formed under the direction of Beijing to align pro-China forces.

Wu is Chair of the Chinese History and Culture Educational Foundation For Youth and the Hong Kong Soong Ching Ling Children's Foundation Ltd.

References

Living people
Hong Kong businesspeople
Year of birth missing (living people)
Hong Kong women in business
Members of the National Committee of the Chinese People's Political Consultative Conference
Hong Kong Basic Law Consultative Committee members
Hong Kong Affairs Advisors
Members of the Selection Committee of Hong Kong
Members of the Election Committee of Hong Kong, 1998–2000
Members of the Election Committee of Hong Kong, 2000–2005
Members of the Election Committee of Hong Kong, 2007–2012
Members of the Election Committee of Hong Kong, 2012–2017
Members of the Election Committee of Hong Kong, 2017–2021
Members of the Election Committee of Hong Kong, 2021–2026
Recipients of the Silver Bauhinia Star